Kahnag may refer to:
Kahnag, Kerman
Kahnag, Khuzestan

See also
Kahnak (disambiguation)